The Oohlas are an American rock band from Los Angeles, California formed in 2004.

History
The Oohlas consist of Olivia Stone (vocals/guitar), Mark Eklund (bass/vocals), Australian, Hayden Scott (drums) and Greg Eklund (vocals/guitar). Stone moved to Los Angeles from Phoenix and met Mark, who was working for Stone's aunt. Mark introduced her to his brother Greg, who had recently left Everclear. Wasting little time, they practiced in Greg's studio and were playing in the Los Angeles area.

The band released an LP entitled Best Stop Pop on September 26, 2006, on Stolen Transmission, a subsidiary of Island Def Jam. In May 2007, they signed to Island Records. They released an EP entitled Chinchilla in early 2009 are on their own and are not currently signed to any record label.

The band has also shared the stage with, among others, Sean Lennon, The Raveonettes, Giant Drag, Burning Brides, Carina Round, the Duke Spirit and Men, Women & Children.

They were featured on the soundtrack for the movie Spider-Man 3, with their song "Small Parts". A Simlish version of "Small Parts" was recorded for The Sims Pet Stories.

Discography
September 26, 2006: Best Stop Pop 
July 24, 2007: "Small Parts" 
February 26, 2009: Chinchilla

References

External links
Official blog
http://www.mtv.com/music/artist/oohlas/artist.jhtml#/music/artist/oohlas/bio.jhtml
http://www.spin.com/features/band_of_the_day/2006/09/060926_theoohlas/
Rollingstone
http://www.calendarlive.com/printedition/calendar/calwknd/cl-wk-bands28dec28,0,6779257.story?coll=cl-weekend

Indie rock musical groups from California
Musical groups established in 2004
Musical groups from Los Angeles